In archaeology, a prismatic blade is a long, narrow, specialized stone flake tool with a sharp edge, like a small razor blade. Prismatic blades are flaked from stone cores through pressure flaking or direct percussion. This process results in a very standardized finished tool and waste assemblage. The most famous and most prevalent prismatic blade material is obsidian, as obsidian use was widespread in Mesoamerica, though chert, flint, and chalcedony blades are not uncommon.  The term is generally restricted to Mesoamerican archaeology, although some examples are found in the Old World, for example in a Minoan grave in Crete.

Prismatic blades were used for cutting and scraping, and have been reshaped into other tool types, such as projectile points and awls.

Morphology

Prismatic blades are often trapezoidal in cross section, but very close in appearance to an isosceles trapezoid.  Triangular blades (in cross-section) are also common.  The ventral surface of the prismatic blade is very smooth, sometimes bearing slight rippling reflecting the direction of applied force and a very small bulb of applied force (indicative of pressure reduction).  Flake scars are absent on the ventral surface of these blades,  though eraillure flakes are sometimes present on the bulb .  The dorsal surface, on the other hand, exhibits scar ridges running parallel to the long axis of the blade.  These facets are created by the previous removal of blades from the core.  The proximal end contains the blade's striking platform and its bulb of applied force, while the distal end will consist of a snap break, a feather termination, or a stepped termination.

Production
Obsidian prismatic blade production was ubiquitous in Mesoamerica, and these tools can be found at a large majority of Mesoamerican archaeological sites from the Preclassic period on until the arrival of the Spanish in the early 16th century. Ethnohistoric sources recount the process of prismatic blade production.  Fray Motolinia, a Spanish observer, recorded:

The production of prismatic blades creates not only a very standardized final product, but also a standardized waste assemblage.  The analysis of obsidian debitage can reveal whether or not prismatic blade production occurred at a site and, if it had, what stages of production the process included. In other words, the types of manufacturing waste present (e.g., rejuvenation flakes and/or blades, platform rejuvenation flakes, etc.) at a site can inform archaeologists about the stage in which blades were being produced.

Notes

References
 Clark, John E. (1997) Prismatic blademaking, craftsmanship, and production: an analysis of obsidian refuse from Ojo de Agua, Chiapas, Mexico.  Ancient Mesoamerica 8:137-159.
 Clark, John E., and Douglas D. Bryant (1997) Technological typology of prismatic blades and debitage from Ojo de Agua, Chiapas, Mexico. Ancient Mesoamerica 8: 111–136.
Hester, Thomas R., Robert N. Jack and Robert F. Heizer. The Obsidian of Tres Zapotes, Veracruz, Mexico.  University of California Archeology Research Facility.  No. 13 pp. 65–131, 1971.

Archaeological artefact types
Lithics
Mesoamerican artifacts
Stone objects